Jean Trounstine is an activist, author and professor emerita at Middlesex Community College in Lowell, Massachusetts.

Early life and education
Jean Trounstine, the daughter of Henry Philip and Amy Joseph Trounstine, grew up in Cincinnati, Ohio. She attended Walnut Hills High School (Cincinnati, Ohio), a public college-preparatory high school recognized as one of the nation's best.
She graduated with a B.A. in theater with honors from Beloit College in 1965, and an M.F.A. in acting from Brandeis University in 1973.
She began her career as an actress, pursued films and theater in California and has performed in 30 plays.

Teaching and activism
Trounstine taught high school English in Duxbury, Massachusetts, (1986-8) and at Nashoba Regional High School (1988-9) before joining the faculty at Middlesex Community College (Massachusetts) in 1989.
In 1987, she began teaching and piloted work with women, directing plays at the Massachusetts Correctional Institution at Framingham for almost 10 years.
She co-founded the women's branch of Changing Lives Through Literature (CLTL) in 1992 with Judge Joseph Dever, First Justice of the Lynn District Court. Probationers, probation officers, judges and professors sit in a classroom together and discuss books.  CLTL costs less than $500 a person and proponents say that it saves the government tens of thousands of dollars when compared with the cost of housing a prisoner.  A recidivism study of the program by University of Massachusetts professor Russell Schutt showed that it helps to reduce a return to crime.
In 2008, after Trounstine met Karter Reed, who was incarcerated in an adult prison for murder that he committed at age 16, she began researching juvenile justice.

Publishing history

Other writing
Her writing on prison issues has been published in Working Woman, The Southwest Review, The Boston Globe Magazine, Huffington Post, and many other publications throughout the country. Some include:

 "A Year of Disaster At Old Colony: Suicide Attempts, Self-Harm, and COVID", DIGBos, May 2021
 Women's Review of Books, May–June 2015, "Changing Women's Lives Through Literature."
 "Keep Kids Out of Handcuffs", Truthout, May 2015
 "Rose", in Essays on Teaching", 2013
 "Locked Up With Nowhere to Go", Boston Magazine, July 2013
 "A Gift from Prison", at Solstice Magazine, Fall/Winter 2012
 "Three Strikes and You're Out", Metrowest Daily News, Jan. 1, 2012
 "Revisiting Sacred Spaces", Performing New Lives: Prison Theatre, 2011
 "The Memory We Call Home", The Best Women's Travel Writing 2008, Travelers' Tales

Prizes and awards
Trounstine has won many awards for her work. She won a grant from the National Endowment for the Humanities in 1987 to study Shakespeare in England.  She won grants from the Massachusetts Foundation for Humanities in 1988, 1989 and 1990. to create theater for women in prison. She was a recipient for "Women who Care," presented by Women in Philanthropy in 1993. In 2000, she was named a "Woman who Dared" by the Jewish Women's Archive for her work in prison. In 2001, she received Honorable Mention for the Ernest Lynton Award for outstanding college teachers nationally who excel in outreach to the community.  Her piece, "Meeting Karter," won an Honorable Mention for non-fiction in Solstice Magazine's 2010 Summer issue. In 2018, the Internation Gramsci Prize was awarded to Trounstine and presented to her in Italy for her work in literature and prison, recognizing the rights of women held in prisons throughout the world.

See also
 Changing Lives Through Literature
 Applied Drama
 Incarceration in the United States

References

Living people
1946 births
Writers from Cincinnati
Middlesex Community College (Massachusetts)
Beloit College alumni
Brandeis University alumni
20th-century American writers
21st-century American writers
20th-century American women writers
21st-century American women writers